Eldar Sattarov is a contemporary writer from Kazakhstan. He was born in 1973 in Almaty of a Vietnamese father and a Tatar mother. In the early 1990s he sang in the first punk rock bands of his country. Former factory worker and then journalist, he started translating and writing in 2000. The books he translated from English, French, Spanish and Italian published in Moscow include authors as diverse as Guy Debord, Raoul Vaneigem, Antonin Artaud, Francisco Ferrer, Giorgio Agamben, Jacques Camatte etc. Sattarov's first novel, Losing Our Streets, about teenage street gangs and drug addiction in the 1980s Almaty, published in 2010, was sold in Russia, Kazakhstan and Ukraine, generating positive feedback from literary critics and readership. His second book, Transit. Saigon-Almaty, published in Kazakhstan in 2015 and later re-published in Russia under a new title Chao Vietnam in 2018, a historical novel about Indochina wars, was short-listed for the National Bestseller award in Russia and took the second place in the final, making Sattarov the first ever Central Asian author to enter the final of Russia's major literary award since the dissolution of the USSR. His third novel The Thread of Time dedicated to a journey of the left-wing idea in the XX century from Antonio Gramsci and Amadeo Bordiga through situationists and up to the author's personal meetings with Gilles Dauvé and Jacques Camatte, has gained him a reputation of a "Russia's Jello Biafra". The novel ends with a prophecy about "potential death of capital". Apart from Russian, Sattarov also writes in English. His short story "Mountain Maid" was published in Singapore and UK, as a part of "Eurasian Monsters" collection edited by Margret Helgadottir. Currently lives between Kazan (Russia) and Almaty (Kazakhstan). In August 2022 Sattarov stated in his interview to the Kazakh channel "Abai TV" that in January of the same year he had signed a contract in Moscow for his fourth novel “The Stooges”, dedicated to the global oil & gas market, however its publication was suspended (as well as the first paper edition of a book by Jacques Camatte in Russian translated by Sattarov from French and contracted with the same publishing house) due to a crisis caused by the 2022 Russian invasion of Ukraine.

See also 

Russian literature

Left communism

References 

1973 births
Living people
Kazakhstani male writers
Kazakhstani people of Vietnamese descent
Kazakhstani people of Tatar descent
Kazakhstani journalists
20th-century Kazakhstani writers
Kazakhstani translators
Kazakhstani expatriates in Russia
20th-century Kazakhstani male singers
21st-century Kazakhstani writers